A by-election was held for the New South Wales Legislative Assembly electorate of Windsor on 12 March 1860 because of the resignation of William Dalley.

Dates

Candidates
Dr Julius Berncastle was a surgeon who specialised in the treatment of eyes (oculist) and ears (aurist). He had stood as a candidate at the 1860 election for West Sydney but had attracted less than 1% of the vote.

William Walker was a solicitor and member of the Anti-Transportation League who had campaigned for John Darvall at the 1856 election for Cumberland North Riding and for Thomas Smith at the 1857 Cumberland North Riding by-election.

Result

William Dalley resigned.

See also
Electoral results for the district of Windsor (New South Wales)
List of New South Wales state by-elections

References

1860 elections in Australia
New South Wales state by-elections
1860s in New South Wales